

Puerto Obaldia Airport  is an airport serving Puerto Obaldía, a Caribbean coastal town in the Guna Yala comarca (indigenous province) of Panama.

Between 2008 and 2010, the deteriorated NW/SE runway was replaced with a longer, wider concrete runway 17/35.

The runway runs uphill from the sea. Mountainous terrain immediately south and east requires approach and departure be made over the water.

Airlines and destinations

See also

Transport in Panama
List of airports in Panama

References

External links
 OpenStreetMap - Puerto Obaldia
 OurAirports - Puerto Obaldia Airport
 Great Circle Mapper - Puerto Obaldia Airport
 Wikivoyage - Puerto Obaldia

Airports in Panama
Guna Yala
Colombia–Panama border crossings